Veronica Carlson (born Veronica Mary Glazier; 18 September 1944 – 27 February 2022) was a British actress who was known for her roles in Hammer horror films. In 2019, she was inducted into the Rondo Hatton Classic Horror Awards' Monster Kid Hall of Fame.

Life and career
Carlson was born in Emley, West Riding of Yorkshire, England, as Veronica Mary Glazier, the daughter of Edith (Allatt), a housemaid, and William Glazier, an RAF officer. Carlson spent most of her childhood in West Germany where her father was stationed. She attended the Thetford Girls' School , Lady Verney High School, High Wycombe and later the High Wycombe College of Art and Technology, where she studied art. It was here that she caught the acting bug, and she participated in college reviews and operettas.

In her mid-twenties, Carlson played a few minor parts in films and television programmes. She was still at college when she auditioned for the Morecambe and Wise film, The Magnificent Two. She had heard that they needed someone who knew judo, and as she had some basic moves she tried out. Most of the other girls were wearing bikinis, although there was one other person in judo garb. Carlson threw her over her shoulder, and she was given the job.

James Carreras, the head of Hammer Films, saw one of her photographs in a newspaper and offered her a role opposite Christopher Lee in Dracula Has Risen from the Grave (1968). She starred in two further Hammer Horror films, Frankenstein Must Be Destroyed (1969) and The Horror of Frankenstein (1970). She starred alongside Peter Cushing, who treated her with a lot of kindness and respect. She said that she found working in Hammer Horror like being part of a big warm family.

She also appeared in the Randall and Hopkirk (Deceased) episode "The Ghost Who Saved the Bank at Monte Carlo" in 1969, an episode of The Saint ("The Man who Gambled with Life"(3rd last ep.)) with Roger Moore, and an episode of Department S ("The Double Death of Charlie Crippen").

Carlson was one of the four main characters in the TV thriller series Spyder's Web (1972), along with Anthony Ainley, Roger Lloyd-Pack, and Patricia Cutts. She had a small role in a 1975 episode of Public Eye playing Ingrid, the German girlfriend of Knaggs, a wanted bankrobber/gangster, played by Ray Lonnen.

Carlson went into semi-retirement after marrying and moving to the United States. Giving up on acting wasn't her intention, but she found that there was an increasing amount of nudity in the industry, which was something she wasn't prepared to do due to her strict upbringing. In later life she lived in South Carolina, with her husband and three children, where she worked as a professional painter. She emerged from a 24 year retirement to star in the 2019 film House of the Gorgon, alongside fellow Hammer film stars Caroline Munro, Martine Beswick, and Christopher Neame. She also enjoyed meeting fans at film conventions in later years.

Carlson died on 27 February 2022 at her home in Bluffton, South Carolina, aged 77.

Filmography

References

External links

Veronica Carlson at HorrorStars
2001 Carlson interview at Rusty Whites Film World
Veronica Carlson interview at Classic Film & TV Cafe
 

1944 births
2022 deaths
20th-century English actresses
21st-century English actresses
Actresses from Yorkshire
Alumni of Buckinghamshire New University
English female models
English film actresses